Shooting at the Moon is the second solo album of Kevin Ayers, on Harvest Records. David Ross Smith of AllMusic writes:

Background

In early 1970, Ayers assembled a band he called The Whole World to tour his debut LP Joy of a Toy that included a young Mike Oldfield, David Bedford, Lol Coxhill, Mick Fincher, the folk singer Bridget St. John and Robert Wyatt. After a UK tour, Ayers took the Whole World into the studio to cut an LP, produced, like his debut, with Peter Jenner.

The line-up produced a heady mixture of ideas and experimentation with two distinctive styles emerging; carefree ballads like "Clarence in Wonderland" and "May I?" abutted the avant-garde experimentation of songs like "Reinhardt and Geraldine" and "Underwater". The album has since become a best seller in Ayers' catalogue.

Although The Whole World disbanded shortly after the release, the nucleus of the group would contribute to Ayers next LP, Whatevershebringswesing. Ayers released a single of exclusive material at the time "Butterfly Dance" coupled with "Puis Je?" (a French-language version of “May I?”)

Gorky's Zygotic Mynci, who were big fans of Ayers, referred to Shooting at the Moon as "the best album ever made" in the sleeve notes to their 1994 album Tatay.

In 1998, The Wire named Shooting at the Moon one of the  "100 Records That Set The World On Fire (When No One Was Listening)".

It was voted number 943 in Colin Larkin's All Time Top 1000 Albums 3rd Edition (2000).

Harvest Records re-released the album on CD in 2003.

Track listing
All songs written by Kevin Ayers

Side one
 "May I?" – (4:01)
 "Rheinhardt & Geraldine/Colores Para Dolores" – (5:41)
 "Lunatics Lament" – (4:53)
 "Pisser Dans un Violon" – (8:02)

Side two
 "The Oyster and the Flying Fish" – (2:37)
 "Underwater" – (3:54)
 "Clarence in Wonderland" – (2:06)
 "Red Green and You Blue" – (3:52)
 "Shooting at the Moon" – (5:53)

Track listing 2003 CD reissue
 "May I?"  – 4:01
 "Rheinhardt & Geraldine/Colores Para Dolores"  – 5:41
 "Lunatics Lament" – 4:53
 "Pisser Dans un Violon" – 8:02
 "The Oyster and the Flying Fish" – 2:37
 "Underwater" – 3:54
 "Clarence in Wonderland" – 2:06
 "Red Green and You Blue" – 3:52
 "Shooting at the Moon" – 5:53
 "Gemini Child" – 3:16
 "Puis Je?" – 3:41
 "Butterfly Dance" – 3:45
 "Jolie Madame" – 2:26
 "Hat" – 5:27

Personnel

Musicians
 Kevin Ayers – guitar, bass, vocals

The Whole World
 David Bedford – organ, piano, accordion, marimbaphone, guitar
 Lol Coxhill – saxophone, zoblophone
 Mike Oldfield – bass, guitar and vocal
 Mick Fincher – drums, percussion, bottles & ashtrays
 The Whole World Chorus – backing vocals

Additional musicians
 Bridget St. John – vocals ("The Oyster And The Flying Fish")
 Robert Wyatt – vocals ("Colores Para Delores")

Technical
 Peter Jenner – producer
 Peter Mews – engineer
 Tom Fu – cover

References

I’m Just Moonlight’s Lost Disciple - Shooting at the Moon liner notes by Martin Wakeling (Harvest Sept 2006)
Shooting at the Moon - original LP notes

1970 albums
Kevin Ayers albums
Harvest Records albums
Albums produced by Kevin Ayers
Albums produced by Peter Jenner